Syngrapha u-aureum, the golden looper moth,  is a moth of the family Noctuidae. It is found from eastern Manitoba to Quebec, Labrador, southern Greenland, Newfoundland, northern Maine, northern New Hampshire and northern New York.

There is one generation per year.

The larvae feed on Vaccinium species.

Subspecies
There are two recognised subspecies:
Syngrapha u-aureum u-aureum
Syngrapha u-aureum vaccinii

External links
 Image
 Species info

Plusiinae
Moths of North America
Moths described in 1852